is a Japanese manga series written and illustrated by Hirō Nakamichi. It focuses on a group of teenage girls and their efforts to set up a board game café. It was serialized in Shogakukan's shōnen manga magazine Monthly Shōnen Sunday from March 2013 to June 2021, with its chapters collected in nineteen tankōbon volumes. An anime television series adaptation by Liden Films aired from October to December 2019.

Plot
Miki Takekasa is a shy high school girl who prefers to keep to herself. One day after school, she encounters a new transfer student named Aya Takayashiki, who convinces her to go on an adventure together. Sometime later, they spot the class representative, Midori Ono, heading into the entertainment district. When they follow her, they learn she works at a game shop. This discovery causes Miki, Aya, and Midori to realize that they share a passion for board games. As such, they spend time playing different games together.

Characters

Miki is a shy girl with short blue hair and turquoise eyes. She does not believe she knows how to have fun and prefers to avoid crowds.

Aya is an exuberant new student with long light brown hair and brown eyes. She has a tendency to treat new acquaintances as old friends.

Midori is the class representative who is a stickler for rules. She has shoulder length dark brown hair and brown eyes. She works in a game shop in the entertainment district.

Takeru is a man of rough appearance, but amicable nature. He is the manager of the game shop where Midori works. He has tanned skin, always wears sunglasses, and is bald.

Emilia is a blonde German/Irish girl who moved from Hamburg to Japan with her father. She transfers to the school where Miki, Aya, and Midori go.

Shōta is a blond boy with brown eyes who is a classmate of Miki, Aya, and Midori's. Having known Midori since preschool, he has a crush on Aya and desires to get close to her.

Ryūji is a friend of Shōta's who is somewhat socially awkward and devoted to practicing kendo. He has a group of fangirls he actively tries to avoid.

Yūto is the student council president. Easy going and popular, he is good at identifying individuals' strengths and weaknesses. He states that he ran for student council to make people smile.

Ren is the student council vice president. She has short pink hair and pink eyes. She and Midori were a team in middle school, and she is determined to get Midori back into student council.

Hana is Aya's mild mannered older sister. She has long brown hair and brown eyes. Her best friend describes her as a magnet for weirdos.

Kyōko is Hana's best friend. She has blonde hair always pulled back in a short ponytail, green eyes, and is usually seen chewing on a stick. She has a threatening persona, but has a track record of defending the underdog.

Media

Manga
After School Dice Club, written and illustrated by Hirō Nakamichi, was serialized in Shogakukan's Monthly Shōnen Sunday magazine from March 12, 2013, to June 11, 2021. Shogakukan has compiled its chapters into individual tankōbon volumes. Nineteen volumes were published from September 12, 2013, to July 12, 2021.

Volume list

Anime
An anime television series adaptation was announced in the October issue of Monthly Shōnen Sunday on September 12, 2018. The series was animated by Liden Films and directed by Kenichi Imaizumi, with Atsushi Maekawa handling series composition, Yukiko Ibe designing the characters, and Shūji Katayama composing the music. It aired from October 3 to December 19, 2019 on ABC, Tokyo MX, and BS11. The series ran for 12 episodes. Miyu Tomita performed the series' opening theme "Present Moment", while Saki Miyashita, Marika Kouno, and Tomita performed the series' ending theme "On the Board".

Episode list

Reception
Anime News Network (ANN) had four editors review the first episode of the anime: Theron Martin was unsure of the "cute girls do games" premise following a pre-established formula, but gave it a "tepid recommendation" on the assumption that it will lead to "good character development" and give the board games a more dramatic presentation; Rebecca Silverman felt underwhelmed by the game scenes but said that it could get better in future episodes along with exploring Miki's social anxiety problems; James Beckett was critical of both Miki and Aya's characteristics being overly familiar but was intrigued by the board game of the week template that will build the ensemble's chemistry and individual development, saying "[T]hat might not exactly be a glowing recommendation, but it means the show is just good enough to avoid the seasonal chopping block, at least for the time being." The fourth reviewer, Nick Creamer, found "an engaging relational dynamic" among the three main leads towards the end but found the journey lacking with Miki's "incisive characterization" being centered by a "generally weak script" propping it up, concluding that: "All in all, After School Dice Club certainly isn't breaking any new ground, but it's a reasonable example of its genre centered on a very appropriate gimmick. If you're a slice of life fan, I'd definitely give it a try." Fellow ANN editor Caitlin Moore reviewed the complete anime series in 2020. She was initially put off by the generic first episode displaying the typical all-girls hobby show tropes, but was won over by both the main cast's camaraderie and exploration of their lives outside the club, and having thorough understanding of the various games they played each episode, concluding that: "After School Dice Club" offers the best of both worlds in terms of narrative and iyashikei anime. It takes the emphasis on friendship and good times and adds just enough development and structure to keep the tension and interest of people who normally don't care for storyless series."

Notes

References

External links
 
 

2019 anime television series debuts
Anime series based on manga
Asahi Broadcasting Corporation original programming
Crunchyroll anime
Iyashikei anime and manga
Liden Films
Medialink
School life in anime and manga
Shogakukan manga
Shōnen manga
Television shows set in Kyoto
Works about board games